Aaron Rogers (born 5 January 1984) is a former Australian rules footballer who played in the Australian Football League (AFL).

Originally from New South Wales, Rogers was recruited to the Melbourne Football Club in the 2001 AFL Draft. However, it was not until he was traded to the Sydney Swans in 2004 that he made his debut. After limited game time and a total of just four disposals over his two matches, he was delisted at the end of the 2004 season. Aaron Rogers played for AFL Canberra side the Eastlake Demons.

Rogers was a member of the 2010 Morningside Australian Football Club premiership team. He was their senior coach in 2012 and 2013, before joining the Gold Coast Football Club's NEAFL team's coaching group in 2014.

Aaron is now a facilitator at Leading Teams.

References

External links
 
 

Australian rules footballers from New South Wales
Sydney Swans players
1984 births
Living people
NSW/ACT Rams players
Eastlake Football Club players
Morningside Australian Football Club players